The Portsmouth Youth Voice Awards (known previously as "the PYV Awards") aims to recognise both individuals and organisations who have made a contribution to youth voice in the city.

The first awards ceremony in 2017 was hosted by Portsmouth Youth Voice chair Sayeeda Nur and Youth Voice Network director Peter Marcus.

Ceremonies 
The first Portsmouth Youth Voice Awards took place as part of the Portsmouth Youth Social Action Conference on Thursday 16 February 2017, at Fratton Park, Portsmouth.

The Portsmouth Youth Social Action Conference was a full day of workshops, discussions and panels. It sought to bring together professionals from the public sector, the third sector, Councillors, youth organisations, and most importantly young people, to discuss, "How do we enable more young people to get involved in volunteering and social action?"

The conference was being jointly hosted by The Portsmouth Together Partnership, Pompey in the Community and Portsmouth Youth Voice and in association with Step Up To Serve and the #iwill campaign.

Eligibility and voting 
Nominees for the six main categories (young person, teacher, school, public sector organisation, community organisation and youth organisation) were sought from the public, particularly young people. Over 30 nominations were received for the 2017 awards. These were then assessed by young people in the city in order to choose a winner.

Nominations for the Youth Voice Star of the year were drawn from those nominated for other awards, as well as on the recommendation of the chair of Portsmouth Youth Voice, the director of The Youth Voice Network and the chief service officer of Portsmouth Together. These were assessed by a panel put together by The Youth Voice Network.

TV and media coverage 

The 2017 awards received coverage on About My Area, a local news website.

Awards 

In 2017, there were 7 categories up for grabs, six of which were nominated by young people in the city. The winners are as follows:

References

2017 awards in the United Kingdom
Portsmouth